The seabed (also known as the seafloor, sea floor, ocean floor, and ocean bottom) is the bottom of the ocean. All floors of the ocean are known as 'seabeds'.

The structure of the seabed of the global ocean is governed by plate tectonics. Most of the ocean is very deep, where the seabed is known as the abyssal plain. Seafloor spreading creates mid-ocean ridges along the center line of major ocean basins, where the seabed is slightly shallower than the surrounding abyssal plain. From the abyssal plain, the seabed slopes upward toward the continents and becomes, in order from deep to shallow, the continental rise, slope, and shelf. The depth within the seabed itself, such as the depth down through a sediment core, is known as the "depth below seafloor". The ecological environment of the seabed and the deepest waters are collectively known, as a habitat for creatures, as the "benthos".

Most of the seabed throughout the world's oceans is covered in layers of marine sediments. Categorized by where the materials come from or composition, these sediments are classified as either: from land (terrigenous), from biological organisms (biogenous), from chemical reactions (hydrogenous), and from space (cosmogenous). Categorized by size, these sediments range from very small particles called clays and silts, known as mud, to larger particles from sand to boulders.

Features of the seabed are governed by the physics of sediment transport and by the biology of the creatures living in the seabed and in the ocean waters above. Physically, seabed sediments often come from the erosion of material on land and from other rarer sources, such as volcanic ash. Sea currents transport sediments, especially in shallow waters where tidal energy and wave energy cause resuspension of seabed sediments. Biologically, microorganisms living within the seabed sediments change seabed chemistry. Marine organisms create sediments, both within the seabed and in the water above. For example, phytoplankton with silicate or calcium carbonate shells grow in abundance in the upper ocean, and when they die, their shells sink to the seafloor to become seabed sediments.

Human impacts on the seabed are diverse. Examples of human effects on the seabed include exploration, plastic pollution, and exploitation by mining and dredging operations. To map the seabed, ships use acoustic technology to map water depths throughout the world. Submersible vehicles help researchers study unique seabed ecosystems such as hydrothermal vents. Plastic pollution is a global phenomenon, and because the ocean is the ultimate destination for global waterways, much of the world's plastic ends up in the ocean and some sinks to the seabed. Exploitation of the seabed involves extracting valuable minerals from sulfide deposits via deep sea mining, as well as dredging sand from shallow environments for construction and beach nourishment.

Structure 

Most of the oceans have a common structure, created by common physical phenomena, mainly from tectonic movement, and sediment from various sources. The structure of the oceans, starting with the continents, begins usually with a continental shelf, continues to the continental slope – which is a steep descent into the ocean, until reaching the abyssal plain – a topographic plain, the beginning of the seabed, and its main area. The border between the continental slope and the abyssal plain usually has a more gradual descent, and is called the continental rise, which is caused by sediment cascading down the continental slope.

The mid-ocean ridge, as its name implies, is a mountainous rise through the middle of all the oceans, between the continents. Typically a rift runs along the edge of this ridge. Along tectonic plate edges there are typically oceanic trenches – deep valleys, created by the mantle circulation movement from the mid-ocean mountain ridge to the oceanic trench.

Hotspot volcanic island ridges are created by volcanic activity, erupting periodically, as the tectonic plates pass over a hotspot. In areas with volcanic activity and in the oceanic trenches there are hydrothermal vents – releasing high pressure and extremely hot water and chemicals into the typically freezing water around it.

Deep ocean water is divided into layers or zones, each with typical features of salinity, pressure, temperature and marine life, according to their depth. Lying along the top of the abyssal plain is the abyssal zone, whose lower boundary lies at about 6,000 m (20,000 ft). The hadal zone – which includes the oceanic trenches, lies between 6,000 and 11,000 metres (20,000–36,000 ft) and is the deepest oceanic zone.

Depth below seafloor  
Depth below seafloor is a vertical coordinate used in geology, paleontology, oceanography, and petrology (see ocean drilling).
The acronym "mbsf" (meaning "meters below the seafloor") is a common convention used for depths below the seafloor.

Sediments 

Sediments in the seabed vary in origin, from eroded land materials carried into the ocean by rivers or wind flow, waste and decompositions of sea creatures, and precipitation of chemicals within the sea water itself, including some from outer space. There are four basic types of sediment of the sea floor:
 Terrigenous (also lithogenous) describes the sediment from continents eroded by rain, rivers, and glaciers, as well as sediment blown into the ocean by the wind, such as dust and volcanic ash.
 Biogenous material is the sediment made up of the hard parts of sea creatures, mainly phytoplankton, that accumulate on the bottom of the ocean.
 Hydrogenous sediment is material that precipitates in the ocean when oceanic conditions change, or material created in hydrothermal vent systems.
 Cosmogenous sediment comes from extraterrestrial sources.

Terrigenous and biogenous 

Terrigenous sediment is the most abundant sediment found on the seafloor. Terrigenous sediments come from the continents. These materials are eroded from continents and transported by wind and water to the ocean. Fluvial sediments are transported from land by rivers and glaciers, such as clay, silt, mud, and glacial flour. Aeolian sediments are transported by wind, such as dust and volcanic ash.

Biogenous sediment is the next most abundant material on the seafloor. Biogenous sediments are biologically produced by living creatures. Sediments made up of at least 30% biogenous material are called "oozes." There are two types of oozes: Calcareous oozes and Siliceous oozes. Plankton grow in ocean waters and create the materials that become oozes on the seabed. Calcareous oozes are predominantly composed of calcium shells found in phytoplankton such as coccolithophores and zooplankton like the foraminiferans. These calcareous oozes are never found deeper than about 4,000 to 5,000 meters because at further depths the calcium dissolves. Similarly, Siliceous oozes are dominated by the siliceous shells of phytoplankton like diatoms and zooplankton such as radiolarians. Depending on the productivity of these planktonic organisms, the shell material that collects when these organisms die may build up at a rate anywhere from 1 mm to 1 cm every 1000 years.

Hydrogenous and cosmogenous 

Hydrogenous sediments are uncommon. They only occur with changes in oceanic conditions such as temperature and pressure. Rarer still are cosmogenous sediments. Hydrogenous sediments are formed from dissolved chemicals that precipitate from the ocean water, or along the mid-ocean ridges, they can form by metallic elements binding onto rocks that have water of more than 300 °C circulating around them. When these elements mix with the cold sea water they precipitate from the cooling water. Known as manganese nodules, they are composed of layers of different metals like manganese, iron, nickel, cobalt, and copper, and they are always found on the surface of the ocean floor.

Cosmogenous sediments are the remains of space debris such as comets and asteroids, made up of silicates and various metals that have impacted the Earth.

Size classification 

Another way that sediments are described is through their descriptive classification. These sediments vary in size, anywhere from 1/4096 of a mm to greater than 256 mm. The different types are: boulder, cobble, pebble, granule, sand, silt, and clay, each type becoming finer in grain. The grain size indicates the type of sediment and the environment in which it was created. Larger grains sink faster and can only be pushed by rapid flowing water (high energy environment) whereas small grains sink very slowly and can be suspended by slight water movement, accumulating in conditions where water is not moving so quickly. This means that larger grains of sediment may come together in higher energy conditions and smaller grains in lower energy conditions.

Benthos

Topography 

Seabed topography (ocean topography or marine topography) refers to the shape of the land (topography) when it interfaces with the ocean. These shapes are obvious along coastlines, but they occur also in significant ways underwater. The effectiveness of marine habitats is partially defined by these shapes, including the way they interact with and shape ocean currents, and the way sunlight diminishes when these landforms occupy increasing depths. Tidal networks depend on the balance between sedimentary processes and hydrodynamics however, anthropogenic influences can impact the natural system more than any physical driver.

Marine topographies include coastal and oceanic landforms ranging from coastal estuaries and shorelines to continental shelves and coral reefs. Further out in the open ocean, they include underwater and deep sea features such as ocean rises and seamounts. The submerged surface has mountainous features, including a globe-spanning mid-ocean ridge system, as well as undersea volcanoes, oceanic trenches, submarine canyons, oceanic plateaus and abyssal plains.

The mass of the oceans is approximately 1.35 metric tons, or about 1/4400 of the total mass of the Earth. The oceans cover an area of 3.618 km2 with a mean depth of 3,682 m, resulting in an estimated volume of 1.332 km3.

Features 

Each region of the seabed has typical features such as common sediment composition, typical topography, salinity of water layers above it, marine life, magnetic direction of rocks, and sedimentation. Some features of the seabed include flat abyssal plains, mid-ocean ridges, deep trenches, and hydrothermal vents.

Seabed topography is flat where layers of sediments cover the tectonic features. For example, the abyssal plain regions of the ocean are relatively flat and covered in many layers of sediments. Sediments in these flat areas come from various sources, including but not limited to: land erosion sediments from rivers, chemically precipitated sediments from hydrothermal vents, Microorganism activity, sea currents eroding the seabed and transporting sediments to the deeper ocean, and phytoplankton shell materials.

Where the seafloor is actively spreading and sedimentation is relatively light, such as in the northern and eastern Atlantic Ocean, the original tectonic activity can be clearly seen as straight line "cracks" or "vents" thousands of kilometers long. These underwater mountain ranges are known as mid-ocean ridges.

Other seabed environments include hydrothermal vents, cold seeps, and shallow areas. Marine life is abundant in the deep sea around hydrothermal vents. Large deep sea communities of marine life have been discovered around black and white smokers — vents emitting chemicals toxic to humans and most vertebrates. This marine life receives its energy both from the extreme temperature difference (typically a drop of 150 degrees) and from chemosynthesis by bacteria. Brine pools are another seabed feature, usually connected to cold seeps. In shallow areas, the seabed can host sediments created by marine life such as corals, fish, algae, crabs, marine plants and other organisms.

Human impact

Exploration 

The seabed has been explored by submersibles such as Alvin and, to some extent, scuba divers with special equipment. Hydrothermal vents were discovered by an underwater camera platform by researchers in 1977. In recent years satellite measurements of ocean surface topography show very clear maps of the seabed, and these satellite-derived maps are used extensively in the study and exploration of the ocean floor.

Plastic pollution 
In 2020 scientists created what may be the first scientific estimate of how much microplastic currently resides in Earth's seafloor, after investigating six areas of ~3 km depth ~300 km off the Australian coast. They found the highly variable microplastic counts to be proportionate to plastic on the surface and the angle of the seafloor slope. By averaging the microplastic mass per cm3, they estimated that Earth's seafloor contains ~14 million tons of microplastic – about double the amount they estimated based on data from earlier studies – despite calling both estimates "conservative" as coastal areas are known to contain much more microplastic pollution. These estimates are about one to two times the amount of plastic thought – per Jambeck et al., 2015 – to currently enter the oceans annually.

Exploitation

In art and culture 
Some children's play songs include elements such as "There's a hole at the bottom of the sea", or "A sailor went to sea... but all that he could see was the bottom of the deep blue sea".

On and under the seabed are archaeological sites of historic interest, such as shipwrecks and sunken towns. This underwater cultural heritage is protected by the UNESCO Convention on the Protection of the Underwater Cultural Heritage. The convention aims at preventing looting and the destruction or loss of historic and cultural information by providing an international legal framework.

See also

References

Further reading 
 Roger Hekinian: Sea Floor Exploration: Scientific Adventures Diving into the Abyss. Springer, 2014.  (print);  (eBook)
 Stéphane Sainson: Electromagnetic Seabed Logging. A new tool for geoscientists. Springer, 2016.  (print);  (eBook)

External links 

 Understanding the Seafloor presentation from Cosee – the Center for Ocean Sciences Educational Excellence.
 Ocean Explorer (www.oceanexplorer.noaa.gov) – Public outreach site for explorations sponsored by the Office of Ocean Exploration.
 NOAA, Ocean Explorer Gallery, Submarine Ring of Fire 2006 Gallery, Submarine Ring of Fire 2004 Gallery – A rich collection of images, video, audio and podcast.
 NOAA, Ocean Explorer YouTube Channel
 Submarine Ring of Fire, Mariana Arc – Explore the volcanoes of the Mariana Arc, Submarine Ring of Fire.
 Age of the Ocean Floor National Geophysical Data Center
 Astonishing deep sea life on TED (conference)

Oceanography
Fisheries science
Articles containing video clips